The Secretary for Security is the member of the Government of Hong Kong in charge of the Security Bureau, which is responsible for public safety, security, and immigration matters.

The post was created in 1973 and since the Principal Officials Accountability System was adopted in 2002, the Secretary for Security has been a member of the Executive Council. Before 1973, the office was known as the Secretary for Defence.

Areas of responsibility include:

 Police Force
 Correctional Services
 Immigration Department
 Customs and Excise Department
 Fire Services Department
 Government Flying Service
 Maritime Rescue Co-ordination Centre

List of office holders
Political party:

Defence Secretary, 1941

Defence Secretaries, 1957–1969

Secretaries for Security, 1973–1997

Secretaries for Security, 1997–present

References

Government ministers of Hong Kong
Security, Secretary for